Lost in the Former West was the final album released by The Fatima Mansions. Writing for Hot Press, Liam Fay said that it is "both Fatima Mansions’ most accessible and most ambitious release yet. It revisits virtually all the bases that the band has touched during its previous four albums but maintains a cohesion and easy-appeal throughout. More than anything else, it is the sound of a group who feel that their time has finally come."

As with Viva Dead Ponies, the song listing as released in the US differed from the UK version, incorporating "Something Bad" and "Go Home Bible Mike" from Valhalla Avenue, while excluding "Sunken Cities". The track "Nite Flights" is a cover of The Walker Brothers song.

Track listing
All songs written by Cathal Coughlan, except where noted.
 "Belong Nowhere" (4:52)
 "The Loyaliser" (3:14)
 "Popemobile to Paraguay" (4:39)
 "Walk Yr Way" (4:58)
 "Brunceling's Song" (4:02)
 "Lost in the Former West" (2:48)
 "Nite Flights" (Scott Walker) (3:49)
 "Your World Customer" (3:31)
 "Sunken Cities" (3:53)
 "Brain Blister" (3:57)
 "A Walk in the Woods" (5:11)
 "Humiliate Me" (3:43)

Personnel 
 Cathal Coughlan – vocals, occasional keyboards
 Andrías Ó Gruama – guitar
 Nick Bagnall – keyboards
 Hugh Bunker – bass guitar
 Nicholas Tiompan Allum – drums, wind

Sources

1994 albums
The Fatima Mansions albums
Albums produced by Jerry Harrison
Albums produced by Gil Norton